Alison Sheridan  is a British archaeologist and was Principal Curator of Early Prehistory at National Museums Scotland, where she worked from 1987 to 2019. She specialises in the Neolithic, Chalcolithic and Early Bronze Age of Britain and Ireland, and particularly in ceramics and stone axeheads.

She was President of The Prehistoric Society from 2010 to 2014 and is Projet JADE Co-ordinator for Britain, Ireland, the Isle of Man and the Channel Islands as well as being the Chair of the Implement Petrology Group and a member of several Editorial Boards. Research topics include the Mesolithic–Neolithic transition and prehistoric jewellery of jet and jet-like materials, faience and amber.

Sheridan was awarded the 2018 British Academy Grahame Clark Medal for outstanding work in prehistoric archaeology. In July 2019 she was elected Fellow of the British Academy.

In 2020 she was voted Archaeologist of the Year by Current Archaeology readers  and presented the prestigious Rhind Lectures hosted by the Society of Antiquaries of Scotland on the topic of "Neolithic Scotland: the Big Picture and Detailed Narratives in 2020"

Biography
Dr Sheridan is from England. She is a professional archaeologist who has worked with National Museums Scotland (NMS) since 1987. She is Principal Curator of Early Prehistory in the Department of Scottish History and Archaeology. She is part of the curatorial team responsible for the Early People gallery in the National Museum of Scotland. During 2000–01, she curated the Royal Museum exhibition Heaven and Hell – and other Worlds of the Dead and in 2016 she curated Jade from the Alps in the National Museum of Scotland.

She has an extensive publication record and is perhaps best known for her model of the multi-strand Neolithisation of Britain and Ireland.

References

External links

 
 

Living people
British archaeologists
British women archaeologists
Year of birth missing (living people)
Fellows of the British Academy
British women curators